The 2008 African Futsal Championship took place in Tripoli, Libya from 21 March to 30 March 2008. The tournament served as a qualifying tournament for the 2008 FIFA Futsal World Cup in Brazil.

The tournament was contested by ten teams, split into two groups of five. Group A was contested of hosts Libya, along with Cameroon, Morocco, Nigeria and Tunisia, while Group 2 consisted of Angola, Egypt, Mozambique, South Africa and Zambia. The matches were played at two venues in Tripoli: Cortuba and African Union.

Group 1 

Matches

Group 2 

Matches

Semi-finals

3rd Place

Final

Honors

Final standings 
  (Qualified to 2008 World Cup)
  (Qualified to 2008 World Cup)

Best players 
 Best Player:  Mohammed Shahout
 Best Goalkeeper:  Mohammed Ali Al-Sharif

External links
Official Site (in Arabic)
CAF Official Site
Futsal On RSSSF
FIFA Official Site

2008
2008
African Futsal Championship
African Futsal Championship, 2008
Futsal
21st century in Tripoli, Libya
Sport in Tripoli, Libya